James Adam Reuben (born May 1987) is a British businessman, son of billionaire investor David Reuben.

Early life
James Adam Reuben was born in May 1987, the son of billionaire David Reuben. He was educated at North Bridge House School and studied business at Regent's University London.

Career
In April 2010, Jamie Reuben's family firm Reuben Brothers bought a stake in Metro Bank and, in October 2011, he was appointed as a non-executive member of the Board of Directors. In February 2015, Reuben resigned from the Board.

In 2011, Jamie Reuben, on behalf of Reuben Brothers Limited, was the co-founder along with financier Andrew Danenza of the investment firm Melbury Capital, whose Advisory Board is chaired by David Reuben.

In the 2012 London mayor election, Reuben served as chairman of Boris Johnson's re-election campaign committee. Reuben has donated £816,000 to the Conservative Party, and is a member of the party's Advisory Board for significant donors.

In May 2018, brothers David and Simon Reuben bought the Burlington Arcade shopping mall for £300m and appointed Jamie Reuben as managing director. On 8 October 2018, Jamie Reuben was appointed to the board of London-based football club Queen's Park Rangers. 
 
Jamie Reuben has been a principal of the Reuben Brothers firm whose projects have included property in Grosvenor Square, properties in  Italy and the 30-room boutique hotel La Residence in Mykonos.

In March 2021, Reuben was appointed co-chair to the Growth Board of homelessness charity Centrepoint.

In October 2021, Reuben became co-owner of Newcastle United Football Club alongside PCP Capital Partners and the Public Investment Fund of Saudi Arabia.

Personal life 
Reuben lives in Marylebone, London.

References

1987 births
Living people
People educated at North Bridge House School
British financiers
British hoteliers
British real estate businesspeople
Conservative Party (UK) donors
Baghdadi Jews
British people of Indian-Jewish descent
British businesspeople of Indian descent